Zombieland is the eighth album by German Neue Deutsche Härte band Megaherz, released on 24 October 2014. The track "Zombieland" appeared in the German RTL commercial for the fourth season of "The Walking Dead".

Track listing

Charts

References

2014 albums
Megaherz albums